Beka Burjanadze (born January 3, 1994) is a Georgian professional basketball player for Pallacanestro Reggiana of the Lega Basket Serie A.

Early career
He played some years in Cajasol Sevilla's junior teams, Beka made his full debut for the first team, on January 16, 2011, against Bizkaia Bilbao Basket.

Professional career
In September 2014 he rescinded his contract to sign with LEB Oro team Básquet Coruña.

On August 17, 2018, he parted ways with MoraBanc Andorra of the Liga ACB to sign a one-year deal with Delteco GBC of the Liga ACB.

On June 17, 2019, he has signed with Herbalife Gran Canaria of the Liga ACB.

On July 29, 2021, he has signed with Real Betis Baloncesto of the Liga ACB.

On November 14, 2022, he signed with Pallacanestro Reggiana of the Lega Basket Serie A.

National team career
Beka Burjanadze is a regular player for the Georgia national basketball teams. He played his first international game against Israel the 3 December of 2016.

References

External links
 Eurobasket link
 Beka Burjanadze's Profile - Euroleague Basketball Official Website
 Beka Burjanadze's Profile - Eurocup Basketball Official Website
 ACB Player Profile
 Liga Adecco Oro Player Profile
 Beka Burjanadze's Profile - Draft Express Website
 FIBA Under-20 Player Profile
 FIBA Under-18 Player Profile

1994 births
Living people
Básquet Coruña players
BC Andorra players
Expatriate basketball people in Andorra
CB Gran Canaria players
Expatriate basketball people from Georgia (country) in Spain
Gipuzkoa Basket players
Liga ACB players
Men's basketball players from Georgia (country)
Pallacanestro Reggiana players
Real Betis Baloncesto players
Small forwards
Basketball players from Tbilisi